The 2014 Sultan of Johor Cup was the fourth edition of the Sultan of Johor Cup. It was held in Johor Bahru, Johor, Malaysia from 12 to 19 October 2014.

The number of teams for the 2014 tournament was the same compared to the previous tournament where six teams competed. Argentina, England and South Korea, who had competed previously, did not participate in this edition and Australia, Great Britain and New Zealand were invited.

India defeated Great Britain 2–1 in the final match to win the cup.

Participating nations
Six countries participated in the 2014 tournament:

 (Host)

Umpires

 Satoshi Kondo (JPN)
 Jonas van 't Hek (NED)
 Dave Dowdall (GBR)
 Vasan Marimuthu (MAS)
 Zeke Newman (AUS)
 Dhaval Prajapati (IND)
 Sajid Ali Rana (PAK)
 Mark Rippin (NZL)

Results
All times are in Malaysia Standard Time (UTC+08:00).

Preliminary round

Classification round

Fifth place game

Third place game

Final

Final standings

See also
2014 Sultan Azlan Shah Cup

References

External links
Official website

Sultan of Johor Cup
Sultan of Johor Cup
Sultan of Johor Cup
Sultan of Johor Cup
Sultan of Johor Cup